An urbarium (English: urbarium, also rental or rent-roll), is a register of fief ownership and includes the rights and benefits that the fief holder has over his serfs and peasants.  It is an important economic and legal source of medieval and early modern feudalism.

Urbaria were also used to record land rent and stock. Depending on the region and writing materials for these lists they are also called Salbuch, Berain, Heberegister, Erdbuch (census book) Zins-Rödel or Rodel.

The term is from the Old High German ur-beran or the Middle High German erbern for  "bring", "create" or "an income derived". It was used for economic, administrative or legal purposes as a directory of real estate, taxation, and the services owed a land holder (such as a monastery or noble) especially in the Habsburg lands.

See also
Manorial roll
Land terrier

References

Feudalism
Social history of the Holy Roman Empire
Real property law